Vasile Mogoș (born 31 October 1992) is a Romanian professional footballer who plays as a defender for Serie C club Crotone.

Club career

Early years
Raised in Moara Domnească, Vaslui County, Romania, Mogoș started his career at Italian Serie D club Asti. Mogoș finished fifth in 2012–13 Serie D Group C with Real Vicenza. The club was invited to play in 2013–14 Lega Pro Seconda Divisione. However, Mogoș was signed by another L.P. 2nd Division club Delta Porto Tolle.

On 26 September 2014 Mogoș was signed by Lega Pro club Lumezzane.

Teramo
On 2 July 2015 Mogoș was signed by Serie B newcomer Teramo in a two-year deal. However, after the club was compelled to relegate to 2015–16 Lega Pro following a match-fixing scandal, Mogoș left the club. Mogoș appeared once for Teramo in 2015–16 Coppa Italia.

Mogoș was signed by Lega Pro team Reggiana in a two-year deal on 2 September.

Chievo
On 24 September 2020, he signed with Serie B club Chievo.

International career
He made his debut for Romania national football team on 15 November 2019 in a Euro 2020 qualifier against Sweden. He started the game and played the whole match in a 0–2 loss.

Career statistics

Club

International

References

External links

1992 births
Sportspeople from Vaslui
Romanian emigrants to Italy
Living people
Romanian footballers
Romania international footballers
Association football defenders
Asti Calcio F.C. players
Real Vicenza V.S. players
F.C. Lumezzane V.G.Z. A.S.D. players
S.S. Teramo Calcio players
A.C. Reggiana 1919 players
Ascoli Calcio 1898 F.C. players
U.S. Cremonese players
A.C. ChievoVerona players
F.C. Crotone players
Serie B players
Serie C players
Serie D players
Romanian expatriate footballers
Romanian expatriate sportspeople in Italy
Expatriate footballers in Italy